Tutuban station (also known as Manila station or Divisoria station) is the central railway terminus of the Philippine National Railways (PNR) network located in the city of Manila, Philippines.

The name refers to two stations: the original Tutuban station, which today forms part of Tutuban Center, and the PNR Executive Building, which houses PNR offices.

History

Tutuban station was built as part of the "Ferrocarril de Manila-Dagupan" or the Manila-Dagupan Line, which constitutes much of the North Main Line today. The cornerstone of the main station building at Tutuban was laid on July 31, 1887. The Manila Railroad Company (MRR) was renamed Philippine National Railways (PNR) under Republic Act No. 4156 enacted after World War II.

In 1988, PNR evaluated the possibility of renting  of land to Tutuban at C.M. Recto Avenue in response to the challenges of development and help promote the site to be the center of trade. PNR implemented the first part of the master development plan of Tutuban Properties, Inc. in 1991, and later entrusted the management and development of the land. The Tutuban Center Mall was formally inaugurated to the public led by President Fidel V. Ramos on February 21, 1994.

The following years have witnessed the continued efforts among PNR, Tutuban Properties, Inc., and the Philippine Government to advance the methods of travel by reorganizing the overall railroad system, improve the civic and business buildings around the Tutuban, and keep the emphasis on history. The development of PNR Plaza is a step to verify the cause of reactivating the overall railroad system as one method of travel and trading.

The Tutuban Station Executive Building was inaugurated on May 30, 1996.

Tutuban station will be renovated to become more transit-oriented and a newer station will be built for the North–South Commuter Railway while the 1996 station will serve only the Manila-Legazpi long-haul intercity services if revived. According to a presentation by JICA in 2019, the old station building nicknamed the "Heritage Building" will be once more included in a transit-oriented mixed-use zone. Therefore, the Tutuban Center Mall that sits in the area of the station will be removed. It will also connect to the LRT Line 2 for ease of transferring between lines.

Gallery

See also
 Paco station

References

External links

 Coordinates

Philippine National Railways stations
Railway stations in Metro Manila
Railway stations opened in 1892
Buildings and structures in Tondo, Manila
Spanish colonial infrastructure in the Philippines